Henri Helman (born 1947) is a French director and screenwriter.

Filmography

References

External links

 

1947 births
French male screenwriters
French screenwriters
Film directors from Paris
Living people